Daniel Christopher McCrossan (born 20 October 1988) is a Social Democratic and Labour Party (SDLP) politician, who has been a  Member of the Northern Ireland Assembly (MLA) for  West Tyrone since 2016.

Education
McCrossan attended Liverpool John Moores University where he undertook a Law Degree. His specialist areas include; Medical Negligence, Criminal Law, Family Law, Corporate Law, Tort & Contract. He has an LLB (Hons) in Law and is currently writing his PhD in Law.

Career
Between 2011 and 2016, McCrossan served as the SDLP's Constituency Representative for West Tyrone. Additionally, McCrossan was elected to the SDLP's National Executive Committee in 2012. His tenure on the SDLP's National Executive came to an end in 2015.

In May 2015, he stood in the 2015 United Kingdom general election for the constituency of West Tyrone. He obtained 6,444 votes, finishing 3rd behind the DUP and Sinn Fein.

In January 2016 he was co-opted to the Northern Ireland Assembly to replace retiring MLA Joe Byrne who stepped aside due to health reasons.

Following the Northern Irish Assembly Election in May 2016, Daniel McCrossan was elected as an MLA for West Tyrone. Receiving 11% of the vote and 4,287 first preference votes. McCrossan was the first person to be deemed elected in the West Tyrone constituency.

In February 2016 McCrossan tweeted his anger at the Renewable Heat Incentive scheme being closed. A press release put out in McCrossan's name on the SDLP website was later deleted. The Renewable Heat Incentive scandal led to the collapse of the Northern Ireland Executive in January 2017.

In March 2017, McCrossan was re-elected as MLA for West Tyrone, increasing the SDLP vote in the constituency to 14.2%, 6,283 first preference votes. Later that year, in June 2017, McCrossan stood in the 2017 Snap Election in West Tyrone. He received 5635 votes and obtained 13% of the vote.

On 3 May 2018, a by-election was held in following the resignation of West Tyrone MP, Barry McElduff. McCrossan obtained 6254 votes with 17.9% of the overall vote. McCrossan increased the SDLP vote in West Tyrone by 4.9%.

On 12 December 2019, McCrossan stood in the 2019 Snap Election and obtained 7330 votes, finishing third and not being elected. This represented 17.8% of the vote and an overall increase of 4.8%.

During McCrossan's time in the Northern Ireland Assembly, he was held a number of positions within the Assembly and the SDLP. These include acting as the SDLP's Infrastructure, Brexit, Economy and Education Spokesperson. Additionally, McCrossan is the chairperson of the Northern Ireland Audit Committee. McCrossan also served on the Northern Ireland Policing Board from 2016-2017.

McCrossan's operates a constituency support office in the town of Strabane.

In July 2022 it was revealed that McCrossan had sent unsolicited text messages to constituents urging them to vote for him. He took the phone numbers from a petition on traffic calming measures outside a local primary school. He was sanctioned by the Information Commissioner's Office for this breach.

Personal life
In August 2019, McCrossan opened a public-house in Strabane, County Tyrone.

In September 2019, McCrossan enrolled in a two-year part-time Masters in Business Administration at the Queen's University Belfast.

References

1988 births
Living people
Alumni of Liverpool John Moores University
People from Strabane
Social Democratic and Labour Party MLAs
Northern Ireland MLAs 2011–2016
Northern Ireland MLAs 2016–2017
Northern Ireland MLAs 2017–2022
Northern Ireland MLAs 2022–2027